Callum Smith (born 12 October 1992) is a British cross-country skier. He took up skiing at the age of eight and made his debut competing for Great Britain in 2008 in a FIS race in Tornio, Finland. He made his debut at the Winter Olympics in 2014, finishing 62nd in the 30km skiathlon and 67th in the 15km classical. He was educated at Inverurie Academy, before studying chemical engineering at the University of Edinburgh.
Callum also competed at the Pyeongchang 2018 winter Olympics, finishing 57th in the Skiathlon and 54th in the 50 km classic events.

He retired from professional cross-country skiing in 2018.

References

1992 births
Cross-country skiers at the 2014 Winter Olympics
Cross-country skiers at the 2018 Winter Olympics
Living people
Olympic cross-country skiers of Great Britain
Alumni of the University of Edinburgh
People educated at Inverurie Academy
Scottish male cross-country skiers
Sportspeople from Aberdeenshire